Room 8 (c. 1947 -  August 13, 1968) was a neighborhood cat who wandered into a classroom in 1952 at Elysian Heights Elementary School in Echo Park, California. He lived in the school during the school year and then disappeared for the summer, returning when classes started again. This pattern continued without interruption until the mid-1960s.

News cameras would arrive at the school at the beginning of the year waiting for the cat's return; he became famous and would receive up to 100 letters a day addressed to him at the school. Eventually, he was featured in a documentary called Big Cat, Little Cat and a children's book, A Cat Called Room 8. Look magazine ran a three-page Room 8 feature by photographer Richard Hewett in November 1962, titled "Room 8: The School Cat". Leo Kottke wrote an instrumental called "Room 8" that was included in his 1971 album, Mudlark.

As he got older, Room 8 was injured in a cat fight and suffered from feline pneumonia, so a family near the school volunteered to take him in. The school's janitor would find him at the end of the school day and carry him across the street.

His obituary in the Los Angeles Times rivaled that of major political figures, running three columns with a photograph. The cat was so famous that his obituary ran in papers as far away as Hartford, Connecticut. The students raised the funds for his gravestone. He is buried at the Los Angeles Pet Memorial Park in Calabasas, California.

Elysian Heights Elementary School has a wall mural on the outside of the school that features Room 8, and the teachers read his book to each new class. Room 8's paw prints are immortalized in cement on the sidewalk outside the school.

In 1972, a cat shelter was started in his name called The Room 8 Memorial Foundation.

See also
 List of individual cats

Further reading
 A Cat Called Room 8, Virginia Finley and Beverly Mason, illustrated by Valerie Martin, G. P. Putnam's Sons, 1966, LCCN 66-14332.

References

External links
Room 8's page on the Elysian Heights Elementary School website
Purr 'n' Fur: Room 8, the Californian School Cat
Room 8 California's Famous Classroom Cat

City of Echo Park
Los Angeles Times August 14, 1968, Section C, Page 1
The Hartford Courant August 1968

1947 animal births
1968 animal deaths
Echo Park, Los Angeles
Individual cats in the United States